The 1983 All-Ireland Under-21 Football Championship was the 20th staging of the All-Ireland Under-21 Football Championship since its establishment by the Gaelic Athletic Association in 1964.

Donegal entered the championship as defending champions, however, they were defeated by Derry in the Ulster final.

On 30 October 1983, Mayo won the championship following a 1-8 to 1-5 defeat of Derry in a replay of the All-Ireland final. This was their third All-Ireland title overall and their first title in nine championship seasons.

Results

All-Ireland Under-21 Football Championship

Semi-finals

Finals

Statistics

Miscellaneous

 The All-Ireland final ends in a draw and goes to a replay for the second time in three years.

References

1983
All-Ireland Under-21 Football Championship